Pure Strength was a strongman competition held from 1987 to 1990 which was created by Tjalling van den Bosch.

Event History
The first year of the event was known as "Pure Strength Challenge" and it was a single man competition featuring only Bill Kazmaier, Geoff Capes and Jón Páll Sigmarsson. The event was held at Huntly Castle in Aberdeenshire, Scotland. Jón Páll won 8 out of 10 events to become the 1987 champion. In 1988, the event became a 2-man team competition held at Allington Castle in Allington, Kent England. The teams were from the United States, Great Britain, the Netherlands and Australia. Team USA would eventually win in 1988, with team members Bill Kazmaier and Stuart Thompson. In 1989, Team Iceland claimed victory with team members Hjalti Árnason and Magnús Ver Magnússon. Kazmaier would win again in 1990 for Team USA along with teammate O.D. Wilson.

Event Placings

All results courtesy of David Horne's World of Grip http://www.davidhorne-gripmaster.com/strongmanresults.html

Venues

References

Strongmen competitions